The Jumbo class are two ferries that were built by Washington State Ferries in 1972 to supersede the . They have a capacity of 2,000 passengers and 188 vehicles.

Ferries in this class:

History 
By the late 1960s, Washington State Ferries was in need of new vessels to replace its aging fleet that required expensive upkeep. The extremely busy Seattle–Bainbridge Island ferry route was also outgrowing the  ferries that were delivered just five years earlier.

The solution was an even larger class of vessels. Instead of just expanding the Super class, the state picked a new design from Phillip Spaulding, that would have a long, low look.

Todd Shipyards in Seattle was awarded the contract to construct two vessels, with plans to order two more if the ferries worked out. While the agency was pleased with the vessels, the funding for the second set of two ships never materialized.

The Jumbo-class vessels would be assigned to the Seattle–Bainbridge route for more than two decades, before they were displaced by the even larger  ferries. Since then, the Jumbo-class vessels have been primarily assigned to the Edmonds–Kingston and Seattle–Bremerton routes.

References

External links 
Washington DOT ferry class information
Washington State Ferries history

Washington State Ferries vessel classes
Ferry classes